Thomas Henry (born November 4, 1969) is a former American football defensive back who played six seasons in the Canadian Football League with the Sacramento Gold Miners, Toronto Argonauts, Ottawa Rough Riders, Edmonton Eskimos, Saskatchewan Roughriders and Hamilton Tiger-Cats. He played college football at Florida State University. He was also a member of the Tampa Bay Storm, Toronto Phantoms and Orlando Predators of the Arena Football League.

Professional career

Sacramento Gold Miners
Henry played for the Sacramento Gold Miners in 1993.

Toronto Argonauts
Henry played for the Toronto Argonauts from 1994 to 1995.

Ottawa Rough Riders
Henry played for the Ottawa Rough Riders in 1996.

Edmonton Eskimos
Henry played for the Edmonton Eskimos from 1997 to 1998.

Saskatchewan Roughriders
Henry played for the Saskatchewan Roughriders in 1998.

Tampa Bay Storm
Henry played for the Tampa Bay Storm from 1999 to 2001, earning Second Team All-Arena honors in 2000 and being named to the AFL All-Rookie Team in 1999.

Hamilton Tiger-Cats
Henry signed with the Hamilton Tiger-Cats in September 1999. The Tiger-Cats won the 87th Grey Cup against the Calgary Stampeders on November 28, 1999.

Toronto Phantoms
Henry was traded to the Toronto Phantoms from the Tampa Bay Storm on November 12, 2001. He was released by the Phantoms on May 14, 2002.

Orlando Predators
Henry signed with the Orlando Predators on May 22, 2002. He was released by the Predators on July 9, 2002.

References

External links
Just Sports Stats
College stats

Living people
1969 births
Players of American football from Florida
American football defensive backs
Canadian football defensive backs
African-American players of American football
African-American players of Canadian football
Florida State Seminoles football players
Sacramento Gold Miners players
Toronto Argonauts players
Ottawa Rough Riders players
Edmonton Elks players
Saskatchewan Roughriders players
Tampa Bay Storm players
Hamilton Tiger-Cats players
Toronto Phantoms players
Orlando Predators players
People from Arcadia, Florida
21st-century African-American people
20th-century African-American sportspeople